Eburia elongata is a species of beetle in the family Cerambycidae.

References

Eburia